Sambalpuri may refer to:
Something of, from, or related to:
 Sambalpur, a city in India
 Sambalpur district
Sambalpuri language

See also 
 Sambalpuri saree
 Sambalpuri cinema
 Sambalpuri culture